Nikolay Stepanovich Leontiev, 1st Count of Abai, (26 October 1862 – 1910) was a Russian military officer, geographer and traveler, explorer of Africa, writer, first Count of the Ethiopian Empire, and veteran of the First Italo-Ethiopian War, the Boxer Rebellion, and the Russo-Japanese War.

Biography
Leontiev was born on 25 February 1862 to a noble family in Kherson Province. He studied in Nikolaev's Cavalry military school, then served in the Uhlan Leib Guard regiment. In 1891, he became esaul of a military reserve force of the Umansk regiment of the Kuban Cossack army.

Like Mashkov and Ashinov before him, Leontiev had dreamed of going to Ethiopia and for many years he collected information about the country. Finally, Leontiev was able to go to Ethiopia on a research trip. Famous scientists, the Science Academy and the Russian Geographical Society took great interest in this programme. But the main task of the Leontiev expedition was to establish friendly relations between Russia and Ethiopia.

Leontiev was the chief of the eleven-man Russian expedition; stabskapitan Zviagin was his deputy. The meeting between Leontiev and the Ethiopian emperor Menelik II set up the foundation for their mutual friendship. When Leontiev decided to go home, Menelik sent his first diplomatic mission to Russia with him, and in doing so abrogated an agreement with Italy that forbade such diplomatic missions.

First Italo-Ethiopian War 

Menelik invited Leontiev to return to Ethiopia with a Russian military mission. In 1895 Menelik ordered 30,000 rifles, 5,000,000 cartridges, 5000 sabres, and a few cannons delivered by Leontiev, which may have helped the Ethiopians acheieve victory during the Battle of Adwa in the first Italo-Ethiopian War. Leonid Artamonov wrote that the Ethiopian artillery comprised 42 Russian mountain guns, but British writers suggest that the Ethiopian guns were Hotchkiss and Maxim pieces captured from the Egyptians or purchased from French and other European suppliers.

According to some sources, Leontiev led a small team of Russian advisers and volunteers at the Battle of Adwa. Other sources assert that Leontiev did not in fact participate in the battle, rather he visited Ethiopia first unofficially in January 1895, and then officially as a representative of Russia in August 1895, but then left later that year, returning only after the Battle of Adwa.

Leontiev returned to St. Petersburg, and then visited Italy and Turkey. In summer 1897, Count Abai was appointed governor-general of the Ethiopian equatorial provinces.

In accordance with the order of emperor of Ethiopia, Directly Nikolay Leontiev participated in one of the military expeditions of the Ethiopian army to the region of Lake Rudolf alongside several thousand Ethiopian soldiers, but the Cossacks there were most exotic of all. A brigade lost 216 persons as killed or injured, Shedevr was injured and the Cossack Gogasov perished. Count Abai was able to solemnly report to the emperor Menelik II, how the young romantic poruchik Shedevr solemnly raised the flag of Ethiopia above one of banks of Lake Rudolf.

Emperor of Ethiopia introduced the title of count, which had never existed in his country before, Nicholai Leontyev was handed an official document that declared him to be Count Abai.

Leontiev organized the first modern battalion of the regular Ethiopian army and presented it to Menelik in February 1899. Leontiev formed the first regular battalion, the kernel of which became the company of volunteers of former soldiers he invited from Senegal, who were trained by Russian and French officers. The first Ethiopian military orchestra was organized at the same time.
Leontiev was in Peking with the Russian contingent in 1900 during the Boxer Rebellion.
A  wound forced Leontiev to leave Ethiopia. Later, he took part in the Russo-Japanese War.

Leontiev died in Paris in 1910, but his body is buried in Saint Petersburg.

Awards 
  Order of Saint Vladimir
  Cross of St. George
  Order of the Star of Ethiopia, 1st Degree
  Grand Cordon of the Order of the Seal of Solomon

See also
Russian people in Ethiopia
 Alexander Bulatovich 
 Leonid Artamonov
 Nikolay Gumilev

Notes

References
 Who Was Count Abai? 
   The activities of the officer the Kuban Cossack army N.S. Leontjev in the Italian-Ethiopic war in 1895-1896.
   Count Leontiev is spy or adventurer...
   Nikolay Stepanovich Leontiev''
  "Vesti" Len.region Rostislav Nikolaev - EMBASSY OF ABYSSINIA IN PETERSBURG
  Диссертация - Эфиопия в оценке российского общественного мнения в конце XIX - начале XX вв.

Further reading 
 Елец Ю. Император Менелик и война его с Италией (по документам и походным дневникам Н. С. Леонтьева) СПб., 1898. С. 302.

1862 births
1910 deaths
Explorers of Africa
Russian nobility
Explorers from the Russian Empire
First Italo-Ethiopian War
Military personnel from Saint Petersburg
Geographers from the Russian Empire
Military personnel of the Russian Empire
Russian military personnel of the Boxer Rebellion
Russian military personnel of the Russo-Japanese War
Ethiopian nobility
Burials at Tikhvin Cemetery
Explorers from Saint Petersburg
Recipients of orders, decorations, and medals of Ethiopia